The Neue Volkszeitung (New People's Newspaper) was a German-language newspaper issued from New York City, United States. The paper had a moderate social democratic orientation and is remembered as a leading anti-Nazi American publication in the German language during the years of World War II.

History

Neue Volkszeitung was launched in New York City in December 1932 as the successor of the New Yorker Volkszeitung. The bulk of the paper's readers were inherited from that recently defunct long-running publication. Average circulation in 1934 stood just shy of 22,000 copies per issue.

Initially, the newspaper sought to portray itself as an organ of German-American labor organizations, but gradually it became closely linked to the exile organization of the Social Democratic Party of Germany, serving as that organization's semi-official voice in America. The paper was published by a company known as the Progressive Publishing Association, Inc.

The Neue Volkszeitung pursued a moderate social democratic political line that stood in opposition both to Nazism and Communism. Content included political news from Germany and the United States, coverage of the international labor movement, sports news, a women's section, travel reports, and coverage of theater and the arts.

Neue Volkszeitung continued publication until the first week of August 1949.

See also

 New Yorker Volkszeitung

Footnotes

Further reading

 Karl J.R. Arndt and May E Olson, German-American Newspapers and Periodicals, 1732-1955 / Deutsch-amerikanische Zeitungen und Zeitschriften, 1732-1955. Revised Second Edition. Heidelberg, Germany: Quelle and Meyer, 1961.
 Karl J.R. Arndt and May E Olson, The German Language Press of the Americas, 1732-1968: History and Bibliography. Munich, Germany: Verlag Dokumentation, 1973.
 Robert E. Cazden, German Exile Literature in America. Chicago: American Library Association, 1970.
 Dirk Hoerder with Christianeharzig, The Immigrant Labor Press in North America, 1840s-1970s: Volume 3: Migrants from Southern and Western Europe. Westport, CT: Greenwood Press, 1987.
 Dirk Hoerder and Thomas Weber (eds.), Glimpses of the German-American Radical Press. Bremen, Germany: Labor Newspaper Preservation Project, 1985.
 Carl Wittke, The German Language Press in America. Lexington, KY: University of Kentucky Press, 1957.

Publications established in 1932
Publications disestablished in 1949
German-American culture in New York City
Socialism in New York (state)
Socialist newspapers
German-language newspapers published in New York (state)